The screamers are three South American bird species placed in family Anhimidae. They were thought to be related to the Galliformes because of similar bills, but are more closely related to ducks (family Anatidae), and most closely related to the magpie goose. The clade is exceptional within the living birds in lacking uncinate processes of ribs. The three species are: The horned screamer (Anhima cornuta); the southern screamer or crested screamer (Chauna torquata); and the northern screamer or black-necked screamer (Chauna chavaria).

Systematics and evolution

Screamers have a poor fossil record. A putative Eocene specimen is known from Wyoming, while the more modern Chaunoides antiquus is known from the late Oligocene to early Miocene in Brazil. Anhimids are most similar to presbyornithids, with which they form a clade to the exclusion of the rest of Anseriformes. Given the presence of lamelae in the otherwise fowl-like beaks of screamers, it is even possible that they evolved from presbyornithid-grade birds, reverting from a filter-feeding lifestyle to an herbivorous one.

Distribution and habitat
The three species occur only in South America, ranging from Colombia to northern Argentina. The horned screamer was once present on the Caribbean island of Trinidad, but is now extirpated from there. They are large, bulky birds, with a small downy head, long legs and large feet which are only partially webbed. They have large spurs on their wings which are used in fights over mates and territorial disputes; these can break off in the breast of other screamers, and are regularly renewed. Unlike ducks, they have a partial moult and are able to fly throughout the year. They live in open areas and marshes with some grass and feed on water plants. One species, the southern screamer, is considered a pest as it raids crops and competes with farm birds.

Behaviour and ecology
Screamers lay between 2 and 7 white eggs, with four or five being typical. The young, like those of most Anseriformes, can run as soon as they are hatched. The chicks are usually raised in or near water as they can swim better than they can run. This helps them to avoid predators. Like ducks, screamer chicks imprint early in life. This, coupled with their unfussy diet, makes them amenable to domestication. They can be excellent guard animals, due to their loud screams when encountering anything new and potentially threatening.

Status and conservation
Both the southern and the horned screamer remain widespread and are overall fairly common. In contrast, the northern screamer is relatively rare and consequently considered near threatened. They are seldom hunted, in spite of their conspicuous nature, because their flesh has a spongy texture and is riddled with air-sacs, making it highly unpalatable. The main threats are habitat destruction and increased intensification of agriculture.

Footnotes

References 
 Carboneras, C. (1992). Family Anhimidae (Screamers). pp. 528–535 in; del Hoyo, J., Elliott, A. & Sargatal, J. eds. Handbook of the Birds of the World, Vol 1, Ostrich to Ducks Lynx Edicions, Barcelona.

External links
Screamer videos on the Internet Bird Collection

Exotic pets
Taxa named by Leonhard Stejneger